The 1952 Northwestern Wildcats team represented Northwestern University during the 1952 Big Ten Conference football season. In their sixth year under head coach Bob Voigts, the Wildcats compiled a 2-6-1 record (2–5 against Big Ten Conference opponents), finished in seventh place in the Big Ten, and were outscored by their opponents by a combined total of 252 to 166.

Schedule

References

Northwestern
Northwestern Wildcats football seasons
Northwestern Wildcats football